I Get Hot is the debut studio album from the American contemporary R&B group LeVert, released in  via independent imprint Tempre Records. The album did not chart in the United States; however, the lead single, "I'm Still", peaked at #70 on the Billboard R&B chart.

Track listing

Personnel
Norman Harris, Quinton Rueben, Robert Cunningham, Russell Evans, Willie Ross - guitar
Michael Ferguson - bass guitar
Billy Biddle, David Webster, Dexter Wansel, Kae Williams Jr., Matt Rose, Mick Rossi, Randy Cantor - keyboards
Dwayne Simon, Perry Wilson - drums

References

External links
 

1985 debut albums
Albums recorded at Sigma Sound Studios
LeVert albums